Bartholomew de Sancto Laurentio was the Dean of Exeter between 1311 and 1326.

Notes

Deans of Exeter